The 2004 regional elections of Venezuela were held on 31 October 2004 to elect 22 governors and 2 metropolitan mayors for a four-year term beginning in 2004 and ending in 2008, when the next regional elections were held. The elections were originally scheduled for 26 September 2004, but faced technical issues and an application for annulment requested by the opposition, and were held under high political pressure after the events of the recall referendum of August 2004. The ongoing political crisis in the country and the proximity of the two electoral processes marked the environment of the elections, which were won by the candidates supported by the president, Hugo Chavez.

A total 1,577 political organizations participated in the elections; however, abstention levels reached 52%. As a result, the opposition held two of the 22 governments but lost the Caracas and capital district mayorships. Claudio Fermin, who run for precedency in the elections of 2000, had no success at the metropolitan mayorship of Caracas, losing to Juan Barreto. Opposition candidate and incumbent governor Enrique Mendoza, who was considered as a possible future presidential candidate, lost the elections of the Miranda state to Diosdado Cabello. Manuel Rosales, who would later run for presidency in the elections of 2006, became the governor of the Zulia state.

Candidates
Following, the list of three main candidates according to their political affiliation (government, opposition and dissident or independent) ordered by number of votes attained. The political affiliation is determined by the political parties supporting each candidate. For the 2004 elections, government candidates were supported by the Fifth Republic Movement (MVR) party; opposition candidates were supported by either Democratic Action (AD), Justice First Movement (PJ), A New Era (UNT), or the Political Electoral Independent Organization Committee (COPEI) party; and independent candidates were mostly supported by regional parties.

Metropolitan mayors

Governors

References
General

Specific

Further reading

2004
2004 elections in South America
2004 in Venezuela
October 2004 events in South America